This article is a list of pharmacy organisations in the United Kingdom.



List

A
Association of the British Pharmaceutical Industry (ABPI)

B
Bandolier 
British National Formulary (BNF)
British National Formulary for Children (BNFC)
British Pharmacopoeia Commission (BPC)

C
Cochrane Collaboration 
Commission on Human Medicines

D
Department of Health (DoH)
DrugScope

E

F

G
General Pharmaceutical Council (GPhC)

H

I

J

K

L

M
Medicines and Healthcare products Regulatory Agency (MHRA)

N
National Pharmacy Association (NPA)
National Institute for Health and Care Excellence (NICE)
National Patient Safety Agency (NPSA)
NHS Confederation

O

P
Pharmaceutical Services Negotiating Committee (PSNC)
Pharmaceutical Society of Northern Ireland
Pharmacists' Defence Association (PDA)

Q

R
Royal Pharmaceutical Society (RPS)

S
Scottish Medicines Consortium (SMC)

T

U

 UK Clinical Pharmacy Association

V
Veterinary Medicines Directorate, an Executive Agency of the Department for Environment, Food and Rural Affairs (Defra)

W
Worshipful Society of Apothecaries of London

X

Y

Z

See also
 History of pharmacy
List of schools of pharmacy in the United Kingdom
List of pharmaceutical manufacturers in the United Kingdom
List of pharmacy associations

United Kingdom
Pharmacy
Pharmacy organizations
United Kingdom